CR or Cr may refer to:

In business
 Conversion rate, in marketing
 Credit Record, in accounting
 Crown Royal, a brand of Canadian whisky

Organizations

Religious organizations
 Celtic Reconstructionism, a form of Polytheism
 Congregation of Clerics Regular of the Divine Providence (Theatines), a Roman Catholic religious order
 Community of the Resurrection, an Anglican religious order
 Congregation of the Resurrection, a Catholic religious order

Other organizations
 Choose Responsibility, a US non-profit addressing alcohol consumption by young adults
 Consumer Reports, an American nonprofit consumer organization dedicated to independent product testing, investigative journalism, consumer-oriented research, public education, and consumer advocacy; publishes a magazine of the same name
 College of the Redwoods, a public two-year community college in Humboldt County, California, US
 College Republicans, a college branch of the US political party
 Czech Radio, a public radio broadcaster in the Czech Republic

People
 C. Rajagopalachari, Indian politician
 Christina Ricci, American actress
 Chris Rock, American comedian and actor
 Cristiano Ronaldo, Portuguese footballer
 Christopher Reeve, American actor
 A Royal cypher representing a monarch
 Charles Rex (CR / CIIIR), the royal cypher of King Charles III

Places

Countries
 Coral Sea Islands (FIPS country code and obsolete NATO country code CR)
 Costa Rica (ISO 3166-1 country code)
 .cr, the top-level domain (ccTLD) for Costa Rica
 Czech Republic

Other places
 CR postcode area in south London, UK
 Castle Rock (disambiguation)
 Campbell River (disambiguation), various rivers
 Cedar Rapids, Iowa, US
 Crawford County, Kansas, US
 Province of Cremona, Italy
 Disney's Contemporary Resort, at Walt Disney World

Publications
 Casino Royale (novel), a James Bond novel
 Comptes Rendus (disambiguation), several publications of the Comptes Rendus (proceedings) of academic organizations
 Comptes rendus de l'Académie des Sciences, the proceedings of the French Académie des Sciences, often simply Comptes Rendus or CR
 Consumer Reports#Publications, various publications and media by organization of the same name
 Critical Review (disambiguation), several publications by this name
 CR (magazine), magazine published by the American Association for Cancer Research

Mathematics, science, and technology

Biology and medicine
 CR gas, dibenzoxazepine
 Calorie restriction
 Chemokine receptor
 Complete remission, in oncology
 Computed radiography
 Controlled/continuous release, see time release technology
 Creatine, a molecule found in myocytes
 Critically endangered species

Computing and telecommunications
 Candidate recommendation, in W3C recommendations
 Carriage return, a new line of text in typing and computing
 Challenge-response spam filtering
 Code review, a systematic examination of computer source code during development
 Cognitive radio, an outgrowth of software-defined radio
 Cognitive robotics
 Control Register
 Card reader

Other uses in mathematics, science, and technology
 Chromium, symbol Cr, a chemical element
 Cr or CR, an improper designation given to astronomical objects in the Collinder catalog of open clusters from Collinder 1–471
 Change request, a document containing a call for an adjustment of a system
 Compression ratio, the ratio of the volume of a combustion chamber from its largest capacity to its smallest capacity
 Concentration ratio, in economics
 Conjugate residual method, an iterative numeric method used for solving systems of linear equations
 Complex resistivity (measurement method), a measurement method in geophysics
 Cosmic rays

Photography
Camera Raw, an image file raw converter by Adobe

Sports
 Colorado Rockies, a Major League Baseball team
 Cincinnati Reds, another Major League Baseball team
 Colorado Rockies (NHL), a former National Hockey League team
 Cristiano Ronaldo, footballer
 Commonwealth record in athletics
 Commonwealth record in swimming

Transport

Railways
 Caledonian Railway (Scotland)
 Commonwealth Railways (Australia)
 Central Railway (India)
 Chiltern Railways (England)
 China Railway, or China Railway Corporation, a national corporation in People's Republic of China
 Consolidated Rail Corporation (Conrail), US
 Copper Range Railroad

Roads
 County highway, county road, or county route
 Legislative route (Minnesota) or constitutional route

Other uses
 Clash Royale, a popular mobile strategy game developed and published by Supercell
 Chart Rulership or Chart Ruler, in astrology
 Comfort room, another name for a public toilet
 Consciousness raising, in social activism
 Continuing resolution, a type of appropriations legislation in the US
 Cookie Run, a side-scrolling mobile casual video game by Devsisters
 Councillor, a title for a public servant, used in Australia and New Zealand
 Cree language (ISO 639 alpha-2 code CR)
 Critical reading, a skill measured by the Scholastic Aptitude Test (SAT)
 Critical Role, a Dungeons & Dragons show
 Critical Role Productions; the associated media production company
 Crore, a number representing 10,000,000 in the Hindu-Arabic numeral system
 Cr$ or ₢, symbol for Brazilian cruzeiro

See also
 CRCR (disambiguation)
 Comptes Rendus (disambiguation)